Roland John Parker  (19 July 1925 - October 2020) was an English former first-class cricketer and Royal Air Force officer.

Parker was born at Pudsey, where he was coached by Herbert Sutcliffe and Len Hutton during his youth. He joined the Royal Air Force in the latter stages of the Second World War, serving as a pilot officer as an emergency commission on probation in July 1945. After a successful probation he was promoted to flying officer in October 1945.

He played first-class cricket for the Combined Services cricket team in 1947, making two appearances against Northamptonshire and Gloucestershire, scoring 36 runs. Fifty years later he was a made an MBE in the 1997 Birthday Honours for services to community sport in Pudsey.

References

External links

1925 births
2020 deaths
Cricketers from Pudsey
Royal Air Force officers
Royal Air Force personnel of World War II
English cricketers
Combined Services cricketers
Members of the Order of the British Empire